Gradski stadion u Kutini is a small football stadium in Kutina, Croatia. It serves as home stadium for football club HNŠK Moslavina. The stadium's total capacity is 2,000, out of which 1,010 are seated.

Sources
 Gradski stadion 

Football venues in Croatia
Buildings and structures in Sisak-Moslavina County